Melica mutica, the twoflower melicgrass, is a grass species in the family Poaceae that can be found in southeastern United States.

Description
The species is perennial and caespitose with elongated rhizomes. The main panicle branches are widespread and almost racemose.

Fertile spikelets have filiformed pedicels. They also have 2 fertile florets which are diminished at the apex. Lemma have ribbed literal veins with rugulose and scaberulous bottom. Palea is ciliolate and have scaberulous keels. Rhachilla is extended while sterile florets are barren, cuneate and are clumped.

The species glumes are low and wide.

References

External links
Images
Image of a spiklet

mutica
Endemic flora of the United States
Flora without expected TNC conservation status